Maria Taylor may refer to:

 Maria Taylor (sportscaster) (born 1987), American sportscaster
 Maria Taylor (musician) (born 1976), American musician
 Maria Jane Taylor (1837–1870), British missionary to China
 Maria Madeline Taylor, Australian stage actress

See also
Mary Taylor (disambiguation)